Lucius Marshall "Marsh" Walker (October 18, 1829 – September 7, 1863) was a Confederate general during the American Civil War. He was mortally wounded in a duel with fellow general John S. Marmaduke.

Early life and education
Lucius Marshall Walker was born in Columbia, Tennessee. He was a nephew of President James K. Polk. Walker graduated from the United States Military Academy in 1850, placing 15th of a class of 44. He was brevetted second lieutenant of dragoons and served on frontier duty in Texas. He was commissioned a second lieutenant in 1852, shortly before resigning to return to Tennessee, where he established a successful mercantile business.

Walker lived in St. Francis County, Arkansas, at the time of his enlistment.

American Civil War
With the outbreak of the Civil War, Walker was commissioned colonel of the 40th Tennessee Volunteer Infantry on November 11, 1861. His first assignment was to command the post at Memphis, Tennessee. In 1862, Walker and the 40th Tennessee were ordered to New Madrid, Missouri, to prepare for the Battle of Island Number Ten.

Walker was commissioned brigadier general on March 11, 1862, and was posted at Kentucky Bend, with the command of the 40th Tennessee falling to Lt. Col. C. C. Henderson. He retreated in the face of a much larger U.S. army, threatening to capture all of Walker's command. Being forced to surrender at Island #10, Walker was exchanged and rejoined the army at Corinth, Mississippi, before it retreated to Tupelo. On May 9, 1862, at the Battle of Farmington, his brigade attacked and drove a U.S. force from its entrenchments. He was reassigned to the Trans-Mississippi Department on March 23, 1863, commanding a brigade of cavalry under Lt. Gen. Theophilus Holmes at the Battle of Helena.

Duel with Marmaduke and death

After the Battle of Reed's Bridge on August 26, 1863, Brig. Gen. John S. Marmaduke accused Walker of imperiling Marmaduke's men by being absent from the field in the face of the enemy. Judging from the indications that the enemy was about to flank his position, Walker had withdrawn his troops after dark. Walker felt unjustly accused of cowardice and challenged Marmaduke to a formal duel. "I have not pronounced you a coward," Marmaduke wrote, "but I desire to inform you that your conduct as commander of the cavalry was such that I determined no longer to serve you." Maj. Gen. Sterling Price ordered both officers to remain in their quarters in an attempt to prevent the duel. However, the orders were not delivered to Walker because of a series of mishaps.

At dawn on Sunday, September 6, Walker and Marmaduke squared off with Colt 1851 Navy Revolvers on the north bank of the Arkansas River near Little Rock. Both fired and missed. Marmaduke then recocked and fired again, mortally wounding Walker in the right side, just above the beltline. Walker forgave Marmaduke when the latter offered his assistance. As Walker lay dying, his wife rode from St. Francis to Little Rock, giving birth to their son, Lucius Marshall Walker, Jr.

Lucius M. Walker died at 5 p.m. the next day. He was buried in Elmwood Cemetery (Memphis, Tennessee).

Frank Crawford Armstrong married Maria Polk Walker, daughter of Lucius's brother Joseph Knox Walker. Joseph Walker died on August 21, 1863.

See also
List of American Civil War generals (Confederate)

References
 Eicher, John H., and David J. Eicher, Civil War High Commands. Stanford: Stanford University Press, 2001. .
 Sifakis, Stewart. Who Was Who in the Civil War. New York: Facts On File, 1988. .
 Warner, Ezra J. Generals in Gray: Lives of the Confederate Commanders. Baton Rouge: Louisiana State University Press, 1959. .
 U.S. War Department, The War of the Rebellion: A Compilation of the Official Records of the Union and Confederate Armies, Washington, D.C., 1880–1901, Series I, Vol XXII, Part 1, pages 520-522 and others.

External links
Encyclopedia of Arkansas History & Culture entry

1829 births
1863 deaths
Confederate States Army brigadier generals
Deaths by firearm in Arkansas
Duelling fatalities
People from Columbia, Tennessee
People of Tennessee in the American Civil War
Polk family
United States Army officers
United States Military Academy alumni
American duellists